The 1989 Geneva Open was a men's tennis tournament played on outdoor clay courts that was part of the 1989 Nabisco Grand Prix. It was played at Geneva in Switzerland from 11 September through 17 September 1989. Marc Rosset, who entered the event on a wildcard, won the singles title

Finals

Singles

 Marc Rosset defeated  Guillermo Pérez Roldán 6–4, 7–5
 It was Rosset's only title of the year and the 1st of his career.

Doubles

 Andrés Gómez /  Alberto Mancini defeated  Mansour Bahrami /  Guillermo Pérez Roldán 6–3, 7–5
 It was Gómez's 4th title of the year and the 50th of his career. It was Mancini's 4th title of the year and the 6th of his career.

References

External links
 ITF tournament edition details

 
20th century in Geneva